Immuron is a biotechnology company based in Melbourne, Australia. In 2008, the company changed its name to Immuron Limited, having previously operated as Anadis Limited. 

Immuron is primarily focused on antigen-primed as well as dairy-derived health products. Its proprietary technologies allow a rapid development for polyclonal antibody and other proteins-based solutions to a range of important diseases.. The company specialises in nutraceutical, pharmaceutical and related therapeutic technology products, including oral and GI mucositis, avian influenza, E. coli  travellers' diarrhoea (TD), irritable bowel syndrome (IBS), inflammatory bowel disease (IBD), and Anthrax containment.

In 2005, Anadis signed an agreement with Quebec's Baralex Inc. and Valeo Pharma Inc. for the distribution of Travelan, a product made by Anadis for the Canadian market.

External links
Official website

References

Pharmaceutical companies of Australia
Companies listed on the Australian Securities Exchange